Post Graduate Medical Institute Peshawar (abbreviated as PGMI Peshawar) is a postgraduate medical training institute in Peshawar, Khyber Pakhtunkhwa, Pakistan. Established in 1984, PGMI Peshawar offers FCPS-II training and numerous diploma courses to health professionals throughout Khyber Pakhtunkhwa province. The institute consists of 41 teaching units at Lady Reading Hospital and Hayatabad Medical Complex and is accredited by the College of Physicians and Surgeons Pakistan. PGMI is affiliated with Khyber Medical University and is governed by an executive committee which is responsible for all academic, financial and policy decisions and includes an Annual Academic Inspection & Evaluation.

References

External links

Khyber Medical University
1984 establishments in Pakistan
Educational institutions established in 1984
Medical colleges in Khyber Pakhtunkhwa
Public universities and colleges in Khyber Pakhtunkhwa
Universities and colleges in Peshawar